Andorra is a sovereign landlocked microstate in Southwestern Europe, located in the eastern Pyrenees mountains and bordered by Spain and France. Tourism, the mainstay of Andorra's economy, accounts for roughly 80% of GDP. An estimated 10.2 million tourists visit annually, attracted by Andorra's duty-free status and by its summer and winter resorts.

Notable firms 
This list includes notable companies with primary headquarters located in the country. The industry and sector follow the Industry Classification Benchmark taxonomy. Organizations which have ceased operations are included and noted as defunct.

References 

Andorra